ISO 3166-2:AZ is the entry for Azerbaijan in ISO 3166-2, part of the ISO 3166 standard published by the International Organization for Standardization (ISO), which defines codes for the names of the principal subdivisions (e.g., provinces or states) of all countries coded in ISO 3166-1.

Currently for Azerbaijan, ISO 3166-2 codes are defined for two levels of subdivisions:
 1 autonomous republic (i.e., Nakhchivan Autonomous Republic)
 11 municipalities and 66 rayons

The eleven municipalities have special status equal to the rayons. Şuşa, the disputed municipality, has been removed from the list.

Each code consists of two parts, separated by a hyphen. The second part is either of the following:
 two letters: autonomous republic and municipalities
 three letters: rayons

Current codes
Subdivision names are listed as in the ISO 3166-2 standard published by the ISO 3166 Maintenance Agency (ISO 3166/MA).

Click on the button in the header to sort each column.

Autonomous republic

Municipalities and rayons

 Notes

Changes
The following changes to the entry have been announced in newsletters by the ISO 3166/MA since the first publication of ISO 3166-2 in 1998. ISO stopped issuing newsletters in 2013.

The following changes to the entry are listed on ISO's online catalogue, the Online Browsing Platform:

See also
 Subdivisions of Azerbaijan
 FIPS region codes of Azerbaijan

External links
 ISO Online Browsing Platform: AZ
 Districts of Azerbaijan (with Accents), Statoids.com

2:AZ
ISO 3166-2
Azerbaijan geography-related lists